Fifteen athletes (eleven men and four women) from Belarus competed at the 1996 Summer Paralympics in Atlanta, United States. All their medals were won in athletics.

Medallists

See also
Belarus at the Paralympics
Belarus at the 1996 Summer Olympics

References 

Nations at the 1996 Summer Paralympics
1996
Summer Paralympics